Dr. Ian is a South Korean–China joint project web series starring Sandara Park and Kim Young-kwang in leading roles. The drama has garnered 1,774,308 views on Naver as of May 2016.

Plot

Lee So-dam (Sandara Park), is a quirky office girl who covers her face with her long hair whenever she feels uncomfortable. After being dumped by her boyfriend, she seeks the help of psychiatrist Dr. Mo Ian (Kim Young-kwang), who specializes in hypnosis treatments. He also bears scars of his own from a past relationship. During their sessions, they begin to heal the damage that love caused them together.

Cast
Kim Young-kwang as Dr. Ian/Mo Yi-an
Sandara Park as Lee So-dam
Kim Ho-chang as Jung Tae-soo 
Jung Ji-yoon as Jang Jae-hee 
Choi Dae-sung as Chief Young 
Kris Cho as Oh Heung-yeol

Production 
As early as January 2015, it was announced that Sandara Park and Kim Young-kwang were to be the leads in a new web-drama. This is Park's first leading acting role in seven years since leaving the Philippines. Dr. Ian is jointly produced between South Korean channel Naver and Chinese streaming service Youku. The director, Kwon Hyeok-chan, previously directed hit dramas as Secret Garden, A Gentleman's Dignity, and Master's Sun. Filming began in early February and the first script reading was held successfully around the same time.

Reception

The series was highly anticipated as it marked Park's official reentry into the field since moving back to South Korea. The series was globally popular, catching on in regions such as the United States, Taiwan, and Thailand. Since its release, the drama has amassed views of nearly 2 million.

Episodes

Soundtrack

Awards and nominations

References

External links
Dr Ian official website 

South Korean drama web series
2015 web series debuts
2015 web series endings